Linda Mary Barwick  (born 1954) is an Australian musicologist and professor emerita at the Sydney Conservatorium of Music. Barwick has focused on researching Australian Indigenous music and the music of immigrant communities. She also works in the field of digital humanities, archiving recordings.

Early life and education 
Barwick was born Linda Mary Barwick in 1954. Early publications appeared under her married surname Linda Mary Bone She graduated with a BA (hons, 1980) and PhD (1986) from Flinders University. Her PhD thesis was titled "Critical perspectives on oral song in performance : the case of Donna lombarda".

Career 
Following her PhD, Barwick moved to the University of New England, where she worked with Professor Catherine Ellis and began to study Australian Indigenous music and Aboriginal women's participation in it.

Based at the Sydney Conservatorium of Music, Barwick was co-founder and served as the first director of the Pacific and Regional Archive for Digital Sources in Endangered Cultures (PARADISEC) in 2003. As of June 2022 she is chair of the steering committee of PARADISEC.

In 1995 she co-edited a collection of essays titled The essence of singing and the substance of song recent responses to the Aboriginal performing arts and other essays in honour of Catherine Ellis.

Barwick was elected a Fellow of the Australian Academy of the Humanities in 2014. She was appointed a Member of the Order of Australia in the 2023 Australia Day Honours.

Selected publications

Books

References 

1954 births
Living people
Members of the Order of Australia
Fellows of the Australian Academy of the Humanities
Australian musicologists
Flinders University alumni
Academic staff of the Sydney Conservatorium of Music